Peder Lunde is the name of:
 Peder Lunde Sr. (1918–2009), Norwegian sailor
 Peder Lunde Jr. (born 1942), Norwegian sailor